John Whittaker (born 7 June 1945) is a former UK Independence Party (UKIP) politician who was a Member of the European Parliament (MEP) for the North West England  region from 2004 to 2009.

Whittaker was born in Oldham, Lancashire. He was educated at Queen Mary University of London (BSc Physics, 1966) and the University of Cape Town (PhD Physics, 1980; BA Economics, 1982).  He is a senior lecturer in economics at Lancaster University.  His main research and teaching interests are in monetary policy and macroeconomics, and recently he has taken a particular interest in the problems associated with the single currency.

He stood for UKIP in the Littleborough and Saddleworth by-election in 1995 where he came 5th out of 10 candidates behind the Official Monster Raving Loony Party.

Whittaker was the UKIP's lead candidate in the North West for the European Parliament elections in 1999. Though UKIP gained 6.5% of the vote in the region, he fell short of being elected by about 0.5 per cent. However, in 2004 he was more successful, being one of 12 UKIP candidates to win a European seat in the big UKIP breakthrough of that year.

He contested the 2005 general election for the constituencies of Ashton under Lyne, Crosby, Heywood and Middleton, Hyndburn, Manchester Central, Rochdale, Stalybridge and Hyde and Wigan.

In 2005, Whittaker became UKIP's official spokesman on Economic and Monetary Affairs. In September 2006, following the election of Nigel Farage as leader of UKIP, Whittaker was appointed party chairman.

References

External links

 Feature page on UKIP website
 Profile at European Parliament website

1945 births
Living people
Alumni of Queen Mary University of London
University of Cape Town alumni
UK Independence Party parliamentary candidates
People from Oldham
Academics of Lancaster University
UK Independence Party MEPs
MEPs for England 2004–2009